Bostrichinae is a subfamily of beetles.

External links
Bostrichinae at BugGuide.Net

Bostrichidae